Charles Faumuina (born 24 December 1986) is a rugby union player who plays prop, for  in Top 14 in France and formerly for  internationally. He was a key member of the 2015 Rugby World Cup winning team.

His main position is tighthead prop but has also covered loosehead prop for the Blues.

Early career
Faumuina was a late recruit to rugby union, and played only rugby league until selected for the Papatoetoe High School 1st XV rugby team. His progress in rugby union was rapid and in 2007 he was selected to make his first-class rugby debut for the New Zealand Colts against Canada. The same year he made his debut for Auckland as a substitute against the Counties Manukau Steelers in the Air New Zealand Cup. On 7 March 2009, Faumuina made his Super Rugby debut against the Sharks when international prop John Afoa was ruled out through injury.

In 2011, due to extended injury layoff to Tony Woodcock, Faumuina started the majority of games for the Blues in a successful season.

In 2012 Faumuina played 10 of the Blues first 11 games in the Super Rugby season and missed only the game against the  due to injury.

Blues head coach at the time Pat Lam believed Faumuina, despite his size, has a dancer's agility. "He's a big man but his footwork is unbelievable, he's got footwork like a ballerina and I think it's a massive asset," said Lam.

All Blacks
On 8 September 2012, he made his debut for the All Blacks as a substitute in the 73rd minute in a test against Argentina.

On 15 September 2014 he scored his first international try for the All Blacks in a 24–21 victory against England.

Faumuina was selected for the 2015 Rugby World Cup's 31-man All Black squad and played in many games including the knockout stages, where the squad made history as the first to retain their World Cup title, and the first to win three tournaments.

Toulouse
On 28 October 2016, it was announced Faumuina would join top French club Toulouse in the Top 14 for the 2017-18 season.

References

External links

 Auckland player profile
 Blues player profile

1986 births
New Zealand rugby union players
New Zealand rugby league players
New Zealand sportspeople of Samoan descent
New Zealand international rugby union players
Auckland rugby union players
Blues (Super Rugby) players
Rugby union props
Rugby union players from Auckland
Living people
Barbarian F.C. players
People educated at Papatoetoe High School
New Zealand expatriate sportspeople in France
Expatriate rugby union players in France
New Zealand expatriate rugby union players
Stade Toulousain players